John Francis "Mick" Cremin (14 May 1923 – 13 January 2011) was an Australian rugby union player. Born in Sydney, he graduated from Sydney Boys High School in 1939 and later the University of Sydney. He played for Randwick and New South Wales before making his Test debut against New Zealand at Dunedin on 14 September 1946.

Cremin played as a fly-half in three Tests and 19 matches for Australia. He was renowned as a strategist and became one of the Wallabies' most influential players in the post-World War II period. He died in Sydney on 13 January 2011, aged 87.

References

1923 births
2011 deaths
Australian rugby union players
Australian rugby union coaches
University of Sydney alumni
Australia international rugby union players
Rugby union fly-halves
Rugby union players from Sydney